Dzhankoi Railway station is a station in Dzhankoi, one of the biggest railway stations of Crimea, a territory recognized by a majority of countries as part of Ukraine, but de facto under control and administration of Russia.

History
The station opened in 1874 in the route Melitopol — Simferopol. In 1892, the station became a hub.

The railway junction was twice destroyed during the Civil and Great Patriotic wars.
In 2006-2007 the station was renovated and divided into two parts: the commuter station and the main. Suburban station was built from scratch using high platforms (to stop the trains) and turnstile system. After the reconstruction of the building and the area of the main station — the place has become popular among residents.

As of 26 March 2014 Dzhankoi was one of two (along with Sevastopol) stations of the Crimea Railway, which used an automated system of control over fares.

Trains
 Moscow — Simferopol (via Rostov-on-Don and Port Kavkaz)
 Simferopol — Solyonoye Ozero
 Feodossia — Armiansk
 Dzhankoi — Kerch

References

External links
 Train times on Yandex
 Train times on Yandex

Railway stations in Crimea
Railway stations in the Russian Empire opened in 1874